Zhabotinsky or Jabotinsky (Ukrainian: Жаботинський) is a masculine Ukrainian toponymic surname referring to the village of Zhabotin. Its feminine counterpart is Zhabotinskaya, Jabotinskaya, Zhabotinska or Jabotinska. Notable people with the surname include:

Anatol Zhabotinsky (1938–2008), Soviet Russian physicist
Eri Jabotinsky (1910–1969), Revisionist Zionist activist, Israeli politician and academic mathematician
Leonid Zhabotinsky (1938–2016), Soviet Ukrainian weightlifter
Ze'ev Jabotinsky (1880–1940), Revisionist Zionist leader, father of Eri

Ukrainian-language surnames